The Lee Creek Snowshoe Cabin was built in Glacier National Park in 1925–27 by Austin Swikert as a shelter for winter hikers. The log structure consists of a single room with wood floor, unfinished walls and roof. A trap door in the floor provides access to a small cellar food cache. There is a woodstove with metal chimney.

The cabin was primarily used by rangers on patrol from the Belly River ranger station. The location is close to the Chief Mountain International Highway, built in 1935.  It was, however, a remote place when the cabin was built between 1925 and 1927 by Austin Weikert.

See also
Kootenai Creek Snowshoe Cabin
Lincoln Creek Snowshoe Cabin

References

Park buildings and structures on the National Register of Historic Places in Montana
Log cabins in the United States
Government buildings completed in 1927
National Register of Historic Places in Glacier County, Montana
Log buildings and structures on the National Register of Historic Places in Montana
1927 establishments in Montana
National Register of Historic Places in Glacier National Park
National Park Service rustic in Montana